Nearly Lost You (titled after the single of the same name) is the second greatest hits compilation of the Screaming Trees, released in 2001.

Track listing

References

Screaming Trees albums
2001 greatest hits albums
Grunge compilation albums
Epic Records compilation albums